Clan MacPhail or the Sons of Paul is a Scottish clan of the Scottish Highlands. Known in Scottish Gaelic as Conchie Dhu or Condochy Doye, the clan is mainly associated with the confederation of Clan Chattan.

History

Origins
The original Gaelic name of this clan was Conchie Dhu or Condochy Doye. Originally the MacPhails had a stronghold until 1291 at Fassfern about 16 kilometers west of Fort William.

With Clan Chattan
The MacPhails were always considered to be of old Clan Chattan stock and closely related to MacPhersons, MacBeans and other Cattanach families that together formed the Clan Chattan Federation. Cattanach is still a surname associated to these clans.

The first MacPhails are reputed to have been descended from a Paul Cattanach. MacPhails, or Son of Paul, are mentioned early in the Kinrara Manuscript stating that a Paul Gow MacPhail, "good sir" lived in the time of Duncan, 11th of MacKintosh. The term "good sir" was a custom mainly related to addressing clergymen.

As Clan MacPhail proper
When the Chief of Clan MacKintosh, Angus, married the heiress of Clan Chattan in the 13th century, the majority of the Chattan families including Clan MacPhail moved to eastern Inverness-shire.

In 1414, the name appears in a Retour of Inquest on Donald Thane of Calder's succession to the lands of Dunmaglass, Gillemore M'Phale being one of the inquest.

In 1547, a MacPhail, Duncan Makconquhy Dow leased half the towns of Tullich and Elrick. This lease was inherited through generations.

In 1595, Andrew M'Phail, minister at the Kirk of Croy and Findla MakPhail one of the beillis of Invernes appear in a contract between the magistrates of Inverness and a Robert Waus.

In 1631, another MacPhail entered into a long lease to Invernarnie with the Laird of Kilravock. For 1000 Pound Scots he was granted a wadset and long tack of Invernarnie, which faced the river Nairn and lay within the Barony of Strathnairn in the Parish of Daviot and Dunlichty. The land also included Duglass and Dullatur facing the river Findhorn. These lands were held by descendants until 1773, when the lease was not renewed. The unity of the family was destroyed and a large portion drifted southward to Argyllshire and were largely absorbed into urban life.

A number of Clan Chattan bonds however signed through the 17th and 18th centuries continued to have MacPhail signatures still indicating their stature in the Federation.

Some of the Clan MacPhail chiefs included:

 Duncan MakDonequhy Dow MacPhail in 1546
 Paul MacPhail in 1689
 Robert MacPhail in 1721
 Alexander MacPhail in 1743

The MacPhails of Invernarnie and the Shaws of Tordarroch buried their dead for generations in an enclosure adjoining the east wall of Dunlichty Kirk.

The last lineal MacPhail chief, Paul MacPhail died in Australia in the early 1900s.

Clan Symbols
Members of Clan MacPhail are entitled to wear a crest badge to show their allegiance to their clan chief. This crest badge contains the heraldic crest and heraldic motto of the clan chief. These elements, like the chief's coat of arms, are the heraldic property of the chief alone. Clan badges are usually worn on a bonnet behind the crest badge, or attached at the shoulder of a lady's tartan sash.

Other Clans with small MacPhail Families
Other Clans also have small smatterings of MacPhails:

With Clan MacKintosh
Since the 15th century, Clan MacPhail was found mainly in the lands of Inverernie about 8 km west of Loch Moy, near the ancestral home of the MackIntosh's.

In 1490, a Donald MacPhail witnessed a bond between the Lairds of Mackintosh and Kilravock and two years later between Mackintosh and the Dunbars. This MacPhail is identified as a tenant of Dullatur according to the Exchequer Rolls of Scotland.

A MacPhail, the parson of Croy wrote the history of the MacKintoshes down to the murder of the 15th chief in 1550 and has come to be known as the Croy Manuscript.

Some MacPhails intermarried with MacKintoshes and are entitled to also wear the tartan of Clan MacKintosh due to their close fraternity.

With Clan Cameron
The remnants of Clan MacPhail that stayed in the west and did not migrate with Clan MackIntosh in the 13th century, eventually integrated with Clan Cameron. They appear to have lived on Loch Eil at Fassfern. Some of these MacPhails were cited for cattle raiding with a Ewen Cameron on the Register of the Privy Council in 1547.

Variations on the name found with Clan Cameron include: MacKail, MacKell, MacPhail, MacVail, MacVaaile, MacVaill, MacVale and Paul. These MacPhails are entitled to also wear the tartan of Clan Cameron as they had become fully integrated and are considered a sept of that clan.

With Clan Campbell
Some MacPhails migrated later down to Argyll and integrated with Clan Campbell. Various MacPhails are recorded in Campbell lands in the 17th and 18th century, apparently in one incident, after an argument with their neighbors, Macleans, moved inland to Argyll and Glenlyon. e.g. John MacPhail in Auchauaich around 1691. MacPhails were mainly found in a narrow gorge between Loch Awe and Loch Etive, with a few becoming ship wrights. The ferry from Portachoillan was run by Malcolm MacPhail from about 1800, then by his son John MacPhail from 1830 to 1860, then by his sons Neil and John.

With Clan Donald
Found throughout West Highlands and Islands, including Glengarry, Glencoe, North Uist , Islay and Kintyre.

With Clan Grant
Johannes McFaill was a parishioner in Duthil. Gillepatrik McFale lived in Glenurquhart in 1545. Duncan McFaill was a reader at Cromdale in 1584. Other variants of the name were noted later in Invera’en, Cromdale, Abernethy and Aberlour.

With Clan Macleod of Lewis
Late 18th century MacLeod tradition has it that MacPhails  in their lands are descendants of Páll, son of Bálki, or Paal Baalkeson, His name appears as Pol filius Boke in the medieval Chronicle of Mann and as Paal Baccas in the 19th century Bannatyne manuscript; a 13th-century Hebridean lord who was an ally of Olaf the Black, king of Mann and the Isles. The Bannatyne manuscript states that Paal Baccas had a natural son, from whom descended a family that held the island of Berneray and other lands on Harris under the MacLeods. Matheson proposed that the MacPhails, originally from the Sand district on North Uist, and those from Carloway on Lewis, derived their surname from Páll. There is a township on the northern tip of the Island called Baile Mhicphail (Macphail's village).

A  group of sea crags called the Flannan Isles off the Isle of Lewis was regarded as a refuge of sanctity, as well as being a rich source of seabirds. On Maol nam Both, are found two stone beehive houses named, the Clan MacPhail bothies, which are said to be the remains of two monks' cells, part of a small early Celtic monastic settlement.

Donald MacDonald, in his book Tales and Traditions of the Lewis, dedicates a short chapter to the MacPhails of Lewis. “The MacPhails made their power felt throughout the ages, and we find that they were used as wardens by the MacLeods of Lewis and placed along the west coast...to prevent the Macaulays of Uig from passing north to raid the Morrison territory”.

A Separate and Distinct Line?

With Clan Mackay

A sept of the Clan Mackay by the surname of Polson who are also known as Siol Phail  are, according to Sir Robert Gordon, 1st Baronet, descended from Neil, son of Neil, son of Donald Mackay, 5th of Strathnaver, chief of Clan Mackay. Although one of their ancestors, Neil Neilson Mackay, died fighting against his own Strathnaver kinsmen at the Battle of Drumnacoub in 1433, the Polsons later gravitated back towards their Strathnaver kindred.

In 1497, 1506 and 1511, Sir John Polson who was presbyter and later chanter of Caithness acted for Iye Roy Mackay, 10th of Strathnaver.

At the Battle of Torran Du in 1517, the Polsons supported the Clan Mackay against the Murrays of Aberscross. In a list of men in Sutherland capable of carrying arms during the Jacobite rising of 1745, a number of Polsons appear in the parishes of Loth and Kildonan. However, according to historian Angus Mackay writing in 1906, the sept was no longer numerically strong and many of them had adopted the surname MacPhail or were now signing themselves as Mackay.

Other Complexities

 Mac and Mc prefixes were also dropped by many Highland Gaelic families as they moved south to urban areas such as Glasgow and Edinburgh in their attempts to try to fit in. There was a level of discrimination especially in the aftermath of the Jacobite Rebellion where the more anglicized south had largely supported the government. MacPhail became Phail or even Paul.
 The derived surnames Paul and Paull was also one of considerable antiquity in the parish of Daviot, Inverness-shire and also occurs in the parish of Fintry, Stirlingshire in 1654. It was also found in the Lothians and in Fife. Examples include Robert Paule, a member of the council of the burgh of Stirling in 1528, Patrick Paule, witness at Tuliboil in 1546, Janet Paule in Edinburgh in 1659, Alexander Paull, mercator in Elgin in 1696.
 Numerous MacPhail families migrated or were transported during the Highland Clearances to the colonies of America and Australia and their records have become difficult to trace.
 Not all Scottish Paul families however can trace their origins to Gaelic or Highland clan origins. Some Pauls around the Glasgow area appear to have a Flemish origin. A John Paul, arrived around 1512 to manufacture garments for the Scottish Court of James IV.

Status

Today MacPhails can generally track their origins from these four main migrations in Scotland, mainly showing fealty to larger clans in those regions:

 With Clan Chattan Federation but with their own chief and allied to Clan Mackintosh.
 With Clan Cameron from the 16th century forward.
 With Clan Campbell and others around Argyll and generally not associated.
 With Clan Mackay in the north of Scotland, but no evidence of association with the other three above.

In Folklore
The poet John Leyden, was an enthusiastic collector of old folklore. He compiled a poem "The mermaid". It is based on a gaelic traditional ballad, called MacPhail of Colonsay, and the Mermaid of Corrivrekin. The story states that this MacPhail was carried off by a mermaid, that they lived together in a grotto beneath the sea, that she bore him five children but finally he tired of her and escaped to land.

Notable Descendants

Other Gaelic Derivatives

Irish Derivatives
McFall, McFaul and McPhails records are found clustered in Ulster especially around Antrim and Derry.They appear to date from the British Plantation period.

Other derivations found include MacPhóil, MacPóil, MacPaul, MacVail, Vail, Paulson, Polson and Powlson

Manx Derivatives (no known connection)
MacPhaayl, Maelfabhail;
From the book, Manx Names of 1890 by Arthur William Moore: "Phail is Anglicised from Maelfabhail. Maelfabhail, son of Muircheartach, slain by the Norsemen"

Notes
https://groups.io/g/McPhail-Genealogy
https://www.gwsfhs.org.uk/surname/macphail/
https://www.gwsfhs.org.uk/surname/Paul/

References

Celtic clans
Highlands and Islands of Scotland
Clans
Clans
Names by culture
Clans
Clans
Clans
Clan Mackintosh
Scottish clans